Sarangesa phidyle, also known as the orange flat or small elfin, is a species of butterfly in the family Hesperiidae. It is found from Botswana, south-west Africa, Saudi Arabia, Sudan. In South Africa it is found from the eastern Cape to Eswatini, KwaZulu-Natal, Mpumalanga and the Limpopo Province, the North West Province and Gauteng.

The wingspan is 26–38 mm. Adults are on wing year-round, although they are scarcer in winter and the dry season.

The larvae feed on Barleria and Peristrophe species (including Peristrophe hensii).

References

Butterflies described in 1870
Celaenorrhinini
Butterflies of Africa
Taxa named by Francis Walker (entomologist)